Kerstin Marie-Luise Preßler (born 2 February 1962 in Augsburg, Bayern) is a former female long-distance runner from Germany, who represented West Germany at the 1988 Summer Olympics. She won the Tiberias Marathon in 1986, the 1987 edition of the Berlin Marathon and the 1990 Frankfurt Marathon. She also competed over the half marathon distance and twice won the Berlin Half Marathon (1985 and 1988).

Achievements

References
 

1962 births
Living people
German female long-distance runners
Athletes (track and field) at the 1988 Summer Olympics
Athletes (track and field) at the 1992 Summer Olympics
Olympic athletes of West Germany
Olympic athletes of Germany
Sportspeople from Augsburg
Frankfurt Marathon female winners
World Athletics Championships athletes for West Germany
20th-century German women